The Alutiiq people (pronounced  in English; from Promyshlenniki Russian Алеутъ, "Aleut"; plural often "Alutiit"), also called by their ancestral name  ( or ; plural often "Sugpiat"), as well as Pacific Eskimo or Pacific Yupik, are a southern coastal people of Alaska Natives.

Their traditional homelands include Prince William Sound and outer Kenai Peninsula, the Kodiak Archipelago and the Alaska Peninsula. In the early 1800s there were more than 60 Alutiiq villages in the Kodiak archipelago, with an estimated population of 13,000 people. Today more than 4,000 Alutiiq people live in Alaska.

Terminology 
These terms derive from the names that Russian fur traders and settlers gave to the native people in the region. Russian occupation began in 1784, following their massacre of hundreds of Sugpiat at Refuge Rock just off the coast of Sitkalidak Island near the present-day village of Old Harbor.

All three names (Alutiiq, Aleut, and Sugpiaq) are used now, according to personal preference. Over time, many other ethnonyms were used to refer to this people.

Culture

Fishing and housing 
The people traditionally lived a coastal lifestyle, subsisting primarily on ocean resources such as salmon, halibut, and whale. They supplemented these maritime foods with rich land resources, such as berries and land mammals. Before contact with Russian fur traders, they lived in semi-subterranean homes called ciqlluaq. Today, in the 21st century, the Alutiiq live in coastal fishing communities in more modern housing. They work in all aspects of the modern economy, while also maintaining the cultural value of subsistence.

Language 
In 2010 the high school in Kodiak responded to requests from Alutiiq students and agreed to teach the Alutiiq language. It is one of the Eskimo–Aleut languages, belonging to the Yup'ik branch of these languages. The Kodiak dialect of the language was being spoken by only about 50 persons, all of them elderly, and the dialect was in danger of being lost entirely.

Notable Alutiit 
 Alvin Eli Amason, painter and sculptor
 Linda Infante Lyons, painter and muralist
 Cungagnaq, also known as Peter the Aleut, an Eastern Orthodox saint, reportedly from Kodiak Island.
 Loren Leman, Lieutenant-governor of Alaska, 2002-2006
 Sven Haakanson, executive director of the Alutiiq Museum, and winner of a 2007 MacArthur Fellowship.

See also 
 Chugach
 Awa'uq Massacre
 Alutiiq Museum

References

Further reading 

 Braund, Stephen R. & Associates. Effects of the Exxon Valdez Oil Spill on Alutiiq Culture and People. Anchorage, Alaska: Stephen R. Braund & Associates, 1993. 
 Crowell, Aron, Amy F. Steffian, and Gordon L. Pullar. Looking Both Ways; Heritage and Identity of the Alutiiq People. Fairbanks, Alaska: University of Alaska Press, 2001. 
 Harvey, Lola. Derevnia's Daughters, Saga of an Alaskan Village. A story about the Old Village of Afognak up to and including the strongest earthquake ever recorded on the North American continent and the resulting tsunami of March 27, 1964. 1991 
 Lee, Molly. 2006. ""If It's Not a Tlingit Basket, Then What Is It?": Toward the Definition of an Alutiiq Twined Spruce Root Basket Type", Arctic Anthropology. 43, no. 2: 164. 
 Luehrmann, Sonja. Alutiiq Villages Under Russian and U.S. Rule. Fairbanks: University of Alaska Press, 2008. 
 Mishler, Craig. 1997. "Aurcaq: Interruption, Distraction, and Reversal in an Alutiiq Men's Dart Game", The Journal of American Folklore. (Vol. 110, no. 436): 189–202. 
 Mishler, Craig. 2003. Black Ducks and Salmon Bellies: An Ethnography of Old Harbor and Ouzinkie, Alaska. Donning Company Publishers. Distributed by the Alutiiq Museum & Archaeological Repository, Kodiak, Alaska.
 Mishler, Craig, and Rachel Mason. 1996. "Alutiiq Vikings: Kinship and Fishing in Old Harbor, Alaska", Human Organization : Journal of the Society for Applied Anthropology (Vol. 55, no. 3): 263–269. 
 Mulcahy, Joanne B. Birth & Rebirth on an Alaskan Island; The Life of an Alutiiq Healer. Athens: University of Georgia Press, 2001. 
 Partnow, Patricia H. Making History Alutiiq/Sugpiaq Life on the Alaska Peninsula. Fairbanks, Alaska: University of Alaska Press, 2001.  
 Simeonoff, Helen J., and A. L. Pinart. Origins of the Sun and Moon Alutiiq Legend from Kodiak Island, Alaska, Collected by Alphonse Louis Pinart, March 20, 1872. Anchorage, Alaska (3212 West 30th Ave., Anchorage 99517-1660): H.J. Simeonoff, 1996.

External links 
 Alaska Native Language Center: Alaska Native Languages Map
 Alaskan Orthodox Christian texts (Alutiiq)
 Alutiiq Museum
 List of Native American peoples in the United States

 
Alaska Native ethnic groups
Eskimos
Native American language revitalization